The Faulhorn is a mountain of the Bernese Alps, located between Lake Brienz and Grindelwald in the Bernese Oberland.

The mountain is split between the municipalities of Iseltwald and Grindelwald, with the summit located on the boundary between the two.

The hotel situated on the summit of Faulhorn was built in 1830. It has undergone very little change since then.

References

External links

 Faulhorn on Hikr
 Berghotel Faulhorn

Bernese Alps
Mountains of the Alps
Mountains of Switzerland
Mountains of the canton of Bern
Two-thousanders of Switzerland